Mary Frances Vivian Lobb (1878 – 1939) was an English Land Army volunteer and life companion to the English designer May Morris for 22 years.

Early life 
Mary Francis Vivian Lobb was born in New Malden, Surry in 1878. Her parents were Nicholas William Lobb and Emma Vivian Lobb, and she was the second of their five children. Lobb grew up in Penerthwin and was educated at St. Thomas College in Launceston.

Personal life 
Lobb was a Land Girl, or Land Army volunteer, in World War I. In 1917 Lobb met May Morris, who was living at Kelmscott Manor, which had been her father William Morris' country retreat. Morris had had two relationships with men that had failed before meeting Lobb. Lobb moved in, initially serving as a gardener. Lobb and Morris would spend the rest of their lives together. Lobb was known for wearing sturdy clothes, with a Norfolk jacket and knickerbockers. Evelyn Waugh described Lobb as a 'hermaphrodite' and George Bernard Shaw also described Lobb in negative terms. As time passed, Lobb and Morris traveled through Europe, including visits to Iceland and Gwbert in Wales. 

May Morris died in 1938, leaving £12,000 to Mary Lobb and tenure of Kelmscott Manor, where Lobb remained until her death the following year.Following Morris' death some of the objects in Kelmscott Manor were auctioned off. Lobb donated the jewellery that Morris had left to her to Victoria and Albert Museum in London, and gave the city of Exeter, England her Icelandic artifacts which included a drinking horn.

Death 
Lobb died of heart disease in 1939. Her will stipulated she was to have no coffin, only a plain oblong box. She was cremated; her wish was for her ashes to be "scattered on a Cornish Moor preferably Bosporthennis Manor". She left her notebooks to the National Library of Wales in Aberystwyth.

In 2017, the Kelmscott Manor Museum had an exhibit centered on Lobb.

References

Further reading 

1878 births
1939 deaths
Women's Land Army members (World War I)
People from New Malden
20th-century English women